MTAC may refer to:

Mongolian and Tibetan Affairs Commission of the Republic of China's Executive Yuan
Multiple Threat Alert Center of the United States' Naval Criminal Investigative Service
Middle Tennessee Anime Convention
Mathematical Tables and Other Aids to Computation, technical journal renamed Mathematics of Computation